The Confederate Soldiers and Sailors Monument is an outdoor Confederate memorial installed outside the Williamson County Courthouse in Georgetown, Texas, United States.

History
The monument was installed in 1916.

An anti-racism group, Courageous Conversations, "wants to put a plaque next to the statue addressing slavery as part of the Civil War. Members say the statue, in its current state, represents slavery. Currently, another plaque sits outside the courthouse referring to African-Americans as 'pioneer settlers.'" Williamson County Commissioners voted 4–1 not to allow the plaque, which would require the approval of the Texas Historical Commission in any event. "The commissioners expressed a desire to discuss the issue more, or even consider erecting a civil rights statue."

See also
 1916 in art
 List of Confederate monuments and memorials
 Removal of Confederate monuments and memorials

References

External links

 

1916 establishments in Texas
1916 sculptures
Buildings and structures in Georgetown, Texas
Confederate States of America monuments and memorials in Texas
Outdoor sculptures in Texas
Sculptures of men in Texas
Statues in Texas